Israel Silvestre (13 August 1621 in Nancy – 11 October 1691 in Paris), called the Younger to distinguish him from his father, was a prolific French draftsman, etcher and print dealer who specialized in topographical views and perspectives of famous buildings.

Orphaned at an early age, he was taken in by his uncle in Paris, Israel Henriet, an etcher and print-seller, and friend of Jacques Callot. Between 1630 and 1650 Silvestre travelled widely in France, Spain and Italy, which he visited three times, and later worked up his sketches as etchings, which were sold singly and in  series. His work, especially of Venetian subjects published in the 1660s, influenced eighteenth-century painters of vedute such as Luca Carlevaris and Canaletto, who adapted his compositions.

In 1661 he inherited the stock of plates of his uncle, the printseller Israel Henriet, among which was a large part of the works of  Callot, and many of those of Stefano della Bella. In 1662 he was appointed dessinateur et graveur du Roi and in 1673 he was appointed drawing-master to Louis, le Grand Dauphin. From 1668 he was granted workshop space in the galleries of the Louvre, where the practice of housing eminent artists and craftsmen was a tradition that was originated under Henri IV. Silvestre's atelier was large: he had at least two pupils who had separate careers as engravers,  François Noblesse and Meunier. In 1670 Charles Le Brun recommended him for membership in the Académie royale de peinture et de sculpture. In 1675 his son, the artist Louis de Silvestre, was born at Sceaux.

At his death he left a large collection of drawings, more than a thousand engravings, and other works of art to his sons, whose own artistic tastes he had nurtured. The family collection was sold at auction in 1810.

Gallery of images
The royal party at the enchanted gardens at the Royal Opera of Versailles, theater during the reign of Louis XIV, on May 7-13 1664.

Notes

Sources

 Silvestre, E. de (1869). Renseignements sur quelques peintres et graveurs des XVIIe et XVIIIe siècles: Israël Silvestre et ses descendants, 2nd edition. Paris: Impr. de Madame veuve Bouchard-Huzard.  Copy at Google Books.

Further reading

External links

French draughtsmen
French printmakers
French etchers
1621 births
1691 deaths
Artists from Nancy, France